Lawrence M. Tanenbaum  (born 1945) is a Canadian businessman and chairman of Maple Leaf Sports & Entertainment (MLSE). He owns a 25% stake in MLSE through his holding company Kilmer Sports Inc.

Early life
Tanenbaum was born to a Jewish family, son of Max (owner of York Steel) and Anne Tanenbaum, and earned a Bachelor of Science degree in economics from Cornell University in 1968.

The family's patriarch, Abraham Tanenbaum, left Parczew, Poland, north of Lublin, for New York in 1911. Two Toronto-bound friends from the same town persuaded Abraham to join them. Shortly after arriving in Toronto, Abraham was driving a horse and cart through residential and industrial areas of Toronto looking for scrap metal. By 1914, just before the war in Europe, Abraham had saved enough to bring his wife, Chippa Sura, and two young sons Joseph and Max to accompany him in Toronto. Abraham prospered and constructed the Runnymede Iron and Steel Company into a major steel fabrication company and real estate empire. His son, Max, who founded his own company, York Steel, had seven children, among them Larry, who studied economics at Cornell University.

Business activities

Construction and civil engineering
Tanenbaum is currently chairman and chief executive officer of Kilmer Van Nostrand Co. Limited, having served as president and CEO from 1968 to 2000.  Under his direction, Kilmer developed into a multi-faceted civil engineering construction company whose operating divisions and subsidiaries covered road building and paving, ready-mix concrete, aggregates, heavy construction, trucking and pipe manufacturing.  The heavy construction operations included projects in Canada, the United States and South America and specialized in constructing subways, elevated transit system guideways, bridges and tunnels including the design-build of the Toronto Zoo elevated transit system, the elevated transit system in Miami and subways in Caracas, Atlanta, Calgary and Toronto.  In 1984 this unit was merged with Canadian Foundation Company Ltd. which itself was later merged with Bannister International.  From that time through December 2000 Kilmer's road building, paving and aggregates operations were conducted through Kilmer's wholly owned subsidiary, The Warren Paving & Materials Group Limited.

Tanenbaum served as chairman of Warren, which, until its merger with Lafarge North America, was Canada's largest asphalt paving and aggregate company with operations serving approximately 54 communities.  Warren's activities also included major commercial aggregates operations, liquid asphalt trading and distribution and road maintenance.  In December 2000 Warren was merged into Lafarge North America Inc., North America's largest diversified construction materials company and supplier of cement, aggregates and concrete, and other materials for residential, commercial, institutional and public works construction in the United States and Canada.  As a result of this merger, Kilmer became a significant shareholder in Lafarge NA, and Tanenbaum served on the board and chaired its finance committee until the 2006 buyout by Lafarge SA.

Today, Kilmer's roots in construction are expressed through innovative real estate development and leading edge public private partnerships (P3). Its Kilmer Brownfield Equity Fund reclaims contaminated land in the urban context, through sophisticated risk management and optimizing for highest and best use. Its Kilmer Developments is currently managing three P3's: The Quickload Container Examination Facility in Prince Rupert, B.C.; the 20 Ontario Highway Service Centre locations under the ONroute banner, in partnership with HMS Host and Canadian Tire; and in partnership with Dream, designed, financed and constructed the 2015 Pan Am Games Athletes’ Village, which has been converted into condominiums as part of the Canary District Project.  Kilmer is also part of the consortium that has acquired the passenger terminal operations at Billy Bishop Toronto City Airport.

Kilmer has a long history of private equity investment, beginning in 1975 as a significant shareholder of CUC Broadcasting, where Tanenbaum served on the board of directors and the executive committee of the company.  At the time of its sale in 1994 CUC was Canada's fifth largest cable company, with operations that included paging, publishing, satellite, and radio broadcasting.

Most recently, Kilmer, in partnership with Heartland Coca-Cola Bottling out of Kansas, acquired the Coca-Cola bottling and distribution operations for all of Canada.  The new operation, Coca-Cola Canada Bottling Limited, is owned by Tanbridge Partners LP, of which Tanenbaum is co-chairman.

Kilmer's other current private equity investments include Chaleur Sawmills Limited Partnership, Fornebu Lumber Company Inc. and Cypress Five Star Inc., the Canadian franchisee of Five Guys Burgers and Blaze Pizza.

In addition to its direct investing activities, in 2000 Kilmer founded Kilmer Capital Partners Limited, a private equity investment fund manager, which established two funds to provide equity capital to small and mid-market companies.  Tanenbaum is chairman of Kilmer Capital. Kilmer Capital's investments have included Give and Go Prepared Foods Corp., McGregor Industries Inc., Unisync Corp. Inc., Vansco Electronics Ltd., Atelka Enterprises Inc., Altasciences Inc., Compact Power Inc. and Tribal Sportswear.

Tanenbaum recently served as a member of the advisory council, Toronto Board of Trade.  He also served as a member of the Ontario Investment and Trade Advisory Council; as a member of the advisory committee, Toronto Prosperity Initiative; and as a member of the independent fiscal review panel of the City of Toronto; and the Mayor's Economic Competitiveness Advisory Committee of the City of Toronto.

Sports
Tanenbaum has had a long-standing interest in the sports and entertainment area and to that end in 1991 he spearheaded the effort to bring an NBA franchise to Toronto. In 1996 an interest was acquired in the Toronto Maple Leafs hockey club and arena.  In 1998 Tanenbaum was an active force in the acquisition of the Toronto Raptors basketball team and Air Canada Centre, which, with the Toronto Maple Leafs formed Maple Leaf Sports and Entertainment. Tanenbaum is chairman of MLSE, chairman of the board of the National Basketball Association, and a governor and member of the executive committee of the National Hockey League, the NBA, and Major League Soccer (Toronto FC professional soccer club, which MLSE also owns). He is a member of the board of the Hockey Hall of Fame in Toronto, Ontario.

Philanthropy
Tanenbaum's involvement in community associations includes the following: vice chair of Sinai Health System; co-chair of the Research Committee for the Lunenfeld-Tanenbaum Research Institute; vice-chair, Brain Canada; member, University Council, Cornell University; Honorary Board Member, Baycrest Centre for Geriatric Care; member of the advisory board, Montreal Neurological Institute; co-founder and board member, Tanenbaum Open Science Institute at MNI; member, Dean's advisory council, Schulich School of Business, York University; founding board member, executive committee member and member of the Global Leadership Council of Right to Play; founding member, Centre for Israel and Jewish Affairs; and co-chair, Tomorrow Campaign (UJA).

Personal life
Tanenbaum is married. He has two daughters and one son.

Honours and awards
In recognition of his contributions in the areas of philanthropy, volunteerism and sports, Tanenbaum was appointed an Officer of the Order of Canada on October 25, 2007.

In June 2012, he was awarded an honorary degree of Doctor of Laws, by St. Michael's College at the University of Toronto.

References

External links
Larry Tanenbaum, co-owner of the Toronto Maple Leafs, gives $35-million to Lunenfeld Research Institute
His full biography at Jewish Virtual Library
Larry Tanenbaum
Kilmer Group – Tanenbaum's private investment holding company

1945 births
Living people
Businesspeople from Toronto
Canadian sports businesspeople
Cornell University alumni
Jewish Canadian philanthropists
Maple Leaf Sports & Entertainment
National Basketball Association executives
National Basketball Association owners
National Hockey League executives
National Hockey League owners
Ice hockey people from Toronto
Toronto Maple Leafs executives
Toronto Raptors executives
Toronto Argonauts owners
Officers of the Order of Canada
Jewish Canadian sportspeople